Caesaromagus may refer to:

Chelmsford, England, Caesaromagus to the Romans
Beauvais, France,  Caesaromagus to the Romans